A head badge is a manufacturer's or brand logo affixed to the head tube of a bicycle.

Head badges may be made of metal or plastic, and they may be held in place with adhesive, screws, or rivets. Some are simply stickers, decals, or painted logos.

Head badges for a single brand may change from year to year or from model to model, as demonstrated by the variety (5) of Trek head badges pictured in the gallery below.

Other uses 
The term head badge has also been used to describe other logos:
 An emblem on the cowl of an aircraft.
 An emblem on a military uniform hat.

Gallery

Motor vehicle brand identification badge

Gallery

See also 
 Builder's plate
 Label
 List of current automobile manufacturers by country
 List of bicycle brands and manufacturing companies 
 Nameplate

References

External links 
 flickr Bicycle Head Badge gallery

 

 
Bicycle parts